Ljungstorp och Jägersbo was a locality situated in Höör Municipality, Skåne County, Sweden with 401 inhabitants in 2010. It merged with the locality of Höör in 2015.

References 

Populated places in Höör Municipality
Populated places in Skåne County